Sofie Junge Pedersen (born 24 April 1992) is a Danish professional footballer who plays as a defensive midfielder for Italian Serie A club Juventus FC and the Denmark national team. She previously played for IK Skovbakken and Fortuna Hjørring of the Danish Elitedivisionen, the latter of which she captained, and for FC Rosengård in the Swedish Damallsvenskan.

Club career
Junge Pedersen played for IK Skovbakken until 2011 before moving to Fortuna Hjørring. Skovbakken had made Junge Pedersen and fellow youngster Pernille Harder contracted players in April 2010, in recognition of their exceptional potential.

In June 2015, Junge Pedersen signed for FC Rosengård, after impressing the Swedish Damallsvenskan champions while playing against them with Fortuna Hjørring in the UEFA Women's Champions League. During her time at Rosengård, Junge sustained a serious head injury which left her unable to play for the entire 2016 season. In 2017, FC Rosengård chose not to renew her contract and she signed with Levante UD in the Spanish Primera División. At the conclusion of her contract with Levante in July 2018, Junge moved back to Damallsvenskan where she signed with Vittsjö GIK.
In December 2018, Junge signed for Juventus Women in Italy

International career
At the inaugural 2008 FIFA U-17 Women's World Cup in New Zealand, Junge Pedersen was part of the Denmark team who won their group before losing 4–0 to eventual champions North Korea in the quarter-final.

In December 2011, Junge Pedersen scored on her senior international debut, a 4–0 win over Chile in São Paulo. She was named in national coach Kenneth Heiner-Møller's Denmark squad for UEFA Women's Euro 2013. In 2017, she was named in Nils Nielsen's squad for UEFA Women's Euro 2017 which saw her get playing time in the final against the Netherlands following Line Sigvardsen Jensen's ACL injury.

International goals

Personal life
As well as being a footballer, Junge Pedersen is a widely read intellectual who identifies as a socialist. In addition to her football career and university studies she undertakes charity and development work in Africa.

Honours
Fortuna Hjørring
 Elitedivisionen: 2013–14

FC Rosengård
 Damallsvenskan: 2015

Juventus
 Serie A: 2019–20, 2020–21, 2021–22
 Coppa Italia: 
 Supercoppa Italiana: 2019, 2020–21, 2021–22

References

External links

 
 
 Profile at fussballtransfers.de 
 Profile at soccerdonna.de 
 Profile at dbu.dk 
 Profile at FC Rosengård 

1992 births
Living people
Danish women's footballers
Danish expatriate women's footballers
Danish expatriate sportspeople in Spain
Danish expatriate sportspeople in Sweden
Denmark women's international footballers
Fortuna Hjørring players
Expatriate women's footballers in Sweden
Expatriate women's footballers in Spain
FC Rosengård players
Damallsvenskan players
Footballers from Aarhus
Women's association football midfielders
Vittsjö GIK players
Juventus F.C. (women) players
Expatriate women's footballers in Italy
Danish expatriate sportspeople in Italy
Serie A (women's football) players
Levante UD Femenino players
UEFA Women's Euro 2022 players
UEFA Women's Euro 2017 players